The 1914 Port Adelaide Football Club season was the club's 37th year in the South Australian Football League.

1914 list changes

New recruits

Retirements and delistings

1914 squad 
Due to World War I, many Port Adelaide players enlisted to take part in the conflict at season's end. Of the 1914 squad, Albert Chaplin, Joseph Watson and William Boon would be killed in action.

1914 pre-season

Game 1

Game 2

Game 3

Game 4

1914 home-and-away season

Round 1

Round 2

Round 3

Round 4

Round 5

Round 6 (Queen's Birthday)

Round 7

Round 8

Round 9

Round 10

Round 11

Round 12

Round 13

Round 14

Ladder

Finals

Semi-final

Grand Final

Post season

Championship of Australia

Port Adelaide vs. South Australia

References 

Port Adelaide Football Club seasons
1914 in Australian rules football